Ab Tarikan-e Pain (also Romanized as Āb Tārīkān-e Pā’īn) is a village in Rudkhaneh Rural District, Rudkhaneh District, Rudan County, Hormozgan Province, Iran. At the 2006 census, its population was 182, in 38 families.

References 

Populated places in Rudan County